John E. Arbuckle House, also known as Glenville State College Alumni Center, is a historic home located at Glenville, Gilmer County, West Virginia. It was built in 1910, and is a -story Queen Anne-style building. It is a wood-frame structure, with a brick veneer. It features an octagonal tower and classical porches.

It was listed on the National Register of Historic Places in 1991.

References

Houses on the National Register of Historic Places in West Virginia
Queen Anne architecture in West Virginia
Houses in Gilmer County, West Virginia
National Register of Historic Places in Gilmer County, West Virginia
Houses completed in 1910
Glenville State College